The following is a list of county roads in Santa Rosa County, Florida.  All county roads are maintained by the county in which they reside.

County roads in Santa Rosa County, Florida

References

FDOT Map of Santa Rosa County
FDOT GIS data, accessed January 2014

External links
Santa Rosa County Roads (AARoads)

 
County